Robert Napunyi Wangila (September 3, 1966 — July 24, 1994) was a Kenyan boxer who won a welterweight gold medal at the 1988 Summer Olympic Games. he is the only Kenyan Olympic gold medalist outside athletics and the only boxer from Sub-Saharan Africa outside of South Africa to have won Olympic gold.

Olympic results 
1st round bye
Defeated Đorđe Petronijević (Yugoslavia) RSC 2
Defeated Khaidan Gantulga (Mongolia) TKO 2
Defeated Khristo Furnigov (Bulgaria) 5-0
Defeated Jan Dydak (Poland) walk-over
Defeated Laurent Boudouani (France) KO 2

Pro career
Wangila turned to professional boxing in 1989 and compiled a career record of 22-5-0.

Death
Wangila died from injuries received in a 1994 fight with David Gonzales in Las Vegas. Wangila had been beaten to such a bad condition that the referee Joe Cortez stopped the match in favour of Gonzales, despite Wangila's fierce protests. After the match, Wangila lapsed into a coma in his dressing room.  He was pronounced dead thirty-six hours later. Wangila had converted from Christianity to Islam while in the United States, and his will requested that he be buried according to the wishes of his Muslim wife. Napunyi Wangila, married Queen Noble, May 16, 1992 until his death. The will was challenged by Wangila's family in Kenya, but a judge ruled in favor of a Muslim burial.

External links

Robert Wangila's profile at Sports Reference.com

References

1966 births
1994 deaths
Converts to Islam from Christianity
Sportspeople from Nairobi
Olympic boxers of Kenya
Boxers at the 1988 Summer Olympics
Deaths due to injuries sustained in boxing
Sports deaths in Nevada
Olympic medalists in boxing
Olympic gold medalists for Kenya
Kenyan male boxers
Medalists at the 1988 Summer Olympics
African Games gold medalists for Kenya
African Games medalists in boxing
Competitors at the 1987 All-Africa Games
Welterweight boxers